Stacey B. Gabriel is an American geneticist and Senior Director of the Genomics Platform at the Broad Institute. With Eric Lander, she is also the co-director of the National Human Genome Research Institute's sequencing center at the Broad Institute. She was named the "hottest researcher" on Thomson Reuters' list of the World's Most Influential Scientific Minds in 2014. She was given this honor because she published twenty-three of the most cited papers of 2013, more than any other single researcher recorded by Thomson Reuters. She topped the same list again in 2015. She is also an ISI Highly Cited Researcher.

In 2020, Gabriel helped create and organize a high-throughput COVID-19 testing facility based out of the Broad Institute. Under her guidance, the institute has processed over 10 million tests as of April 2021.

Education 
Gabriel received her B.S. in molecular biology from Carnegie Mellon University in Pittsburgh, and a Ph.D. in human genetics from Case Western Reserve University in Cleveland.

Life and work 
Much of Gabriel’s research interests explore new uses of genomic techniques to identify the genetic basis of common diseases and gain a better understanding of them. After joining the nonprofit Whitehead Institute/MIT Center for Genome Research in 1998, her research has provided a foundation for the International HapMap Project as well as many large national projects. She has also been an active member of the steering committee for international research supporting the 1000 Genomes Project (abbreviated as 1KGP).

Selected publications

References

External links
Faculty page

Living people
Carnegie Mellon University alumni
Case Western Reserve University alumni
American geneticists
American women biologists
American women geneticists
Broad Institute people
Year of birth missing (living people)